AKT Academy Matriculation Higher Secondary School is a school located in A.K.T. Nagar, Neelamangalam, Kallakurichi Tamil. The school was started in 1990.

Location 

Institutes under AKT
 AKT Academy Matriculation Higher Secondary School,
 AKT Memorial Vidya Saaket Senior Secondary School (CBSE),
 AKT Memorial High school(State Board{E/T}),
AKT Memorial girls school,
 AKT Memorial College Of Engineering and Technology,
 AKT Teacher Training,
 AKT Memorial College Of Education (B.Ed/M.Ed),
 AKT Memorial Polytechnic college,
 AKT IIT-NEET Academy.

Academic achievements
10th Matriculation
 1996 - 1997 Villupuram Dist. First 1024/1100 and Villupuram Dist. Second 1009/1100
 1998 - 1999 Villupuram Dist. First 1020/1100
 2006 - 2007 Villupuram Dist. First 1056/1100 and Villupuram Dist. Second 1048/1100

12th Higher Secondary
 2003 - 2004 Villupuram Dist.rajesh First 1170/1200 and Villupuram Dist. Second 1155/1200
 2004 - 2005 Villupuram Dist. First 1164/1200
 2005 - 2006 Villupuram Dist.(R.Aravinth Kumar) Third 1152/1200 and Villupuram Dist.(R.Ravi Chandran) fourth 1150/1200
 2006 - 2007 Villupuram Dist. First 1177/1200 (State 5th Rank )* and Villupuram Dist. Second 1163/1200
 2007 - 2008 Villupuram Dist. (Harinivas.V) First 1179/1200 (State 4th Rank )and Villupuram Dist. FIRST

10th CBSE
 2020 - 2021 Kallakuruchi Dist. CLASS -10 First in School.

Gallery

References

Private schools in Tamil Nadu
High schools and secondary schools in Tamil Nadu
Education in Viluppuram district
Educational institutions established in 1990
1990 establishments in Tamil Nadu